Sant'Andrea Island is a small island near Gallipoli in the Ionian Sea.

See also
 List of islands of Italy
 Isola Sant'Andrea Lighthouse

External links
  Sant'Andrea Island google.maps

Islands of Apulia